George Henry Alexander Clowes (1877–1958) was a medical doctor who worked as the first research director at Eli Lilly and Company. He was responsible for mobilizing Eli Lilly resources to mass-produce insulin, making it available for diabetics beginning in 1923. He was an art collector whose collection of paintings by European Old Masters was donated to the Indianapolis Museum of Art.  He and his two sons established The Clowes Fund in 1952 to fund art, education, and social services. The Clowes Award for cancer research was named in his honor.

His grandson, Alexander Whitehill Clowes, wrote The Doc and the Duchess, a book about his grandfather's life and legacy.

References

External link

American physicians
1877 births
1958 deaths
Indianapolis Museum of Art people